Gregor Foitek (born 27 March 1965) is a Swiss former racing driver. He won the 1986 Swiss Formula 3 Championship. Moving up to Formula 3000 he was widely blamed for causing a race-stopping crash at Brands Hatch in 1988, the restart of which led to a second major crash on the first lap in which Johnny Herbert sustained major leg injuries. Foitek participated in 22 Formula One Grands Prix, debuting on 26 March 1989. He scored no championship points. He later made two CART starts for Foyt Enterprises in 1992 but was knocked out of both races by mechanical issues.

Today he helps run Foitek Automobile, a family-run Ferrari and Maserati dealership in Altendorf.

Formula One career

1989: EuroBrun and Rial
Foitek made his debut at the 1989 Brazilian Grand Prix, however with turbos now banned from F1, the number of entries had grown to 39. Foitek only got to the main qualifying session once, at the first race in Brazil, where he then failed to qualify. After 11 rounds Foitek quit the EuroBrun team.

At the Spanish Grand Prix, Foitek was called up to replace Christian Danner at the Rial team. However, the Rial team were having a bad season and several crew members had left the team. Furthermore, although it was assured of a place in the main qualifying session, the Rial ARC2 was uncompetitive, some five seconds off the next slowest car. In his one race with the team, Foitek's rear wing broke at high speed and he crashed heavily. He immediately quit the team.

Racing record

Complete International Formula 3000 results
(key) (Races in bold indicate pole position; races in italics indicate fastest lap.)

Complete Formula One World Championship results
(key) 

† Driver did not finish the race, but was still classified as they completed 90% of the race distance.

Complete CART results

References

Grandprix.com profile
Racing Reference stats
Driver Database stats

External links
Foitek Automobile

1965 births
Swiss racing drivers
Swiss Formula One drivers
Swiss Formula Three Championship drivers
EuroBrun Formula One drivers
Brabham Formula One drivers
Rial Formula One drivers
Onyx Formula One drivers
Living people
International Formula 3000 drivers
Champ Car drivers
24 Hours of Le Mans drivers
World Sportscar Championship drivers
Sportspeople from Zürich
A. J. Foyt Enterprises drivers